In complex analysis, the argument principle (or Cauchy's argument principle) relates the difference between the number of zeros and poles of a meromorphic function to a contour integral of the function's logarithmic derivative.

Specifically, if f(z) is a meromorphic function inside and on some closed contour C, and f has no zeros or poles on C, then 
 
where Z and P denote respectively the number of zeros and poles of f(z) inside the contour C, with each zero and pole counted as many times as its multiplicity and order, respectively, indicate. This statement of the theorem assumes that the contour C is simple, that is, without self-intersections, and that it is oriented counter-clockwise.

More generally, suppose that f(z) is a meromorphic function on an open set Ω in the complex plane and that C is a closed curve in Ω which avoids all zeros and poles of f and is contractible to a point inside Ω.  For each point z ∈ Ω, let n(C,z) be the winding number of C around z.  Then

where the first summation is over all zeros a of f counted with their multiplicities, and the second summation is over the poles b of f counted with their orders.

Interpretation of the contour integral
The contour integral  can be interpreted as 2πi times the winding number of the path f(C) around the origin, using the substitution w = f(z): 

That is, it is i times the total change in the argument of f(z) as z travels around C, explaining the name of the theorem; this follows from 
 
and the relation between arguments and logarithms.

Proof of the argument principle
Let zZ be a zero of f. We can write f(z) = (z − zZ)kg(z) where k is the multiplicity of the zero, and thus g(zZ) ≠ 0. We get

 

and

 

Since  g(zZ) ≠ 0, it follows that g' (z)/g(z) has no singularities at zZ, and thus is analytic at zZ, which implies that the residue of f′(z)/f(z) at zZ is k.

Let zP be a pole of f. We can write f(z) = (z − zP)−mh(z) where m is the order of the pole, and 
h(zP) ≠ 0. Then,

 

and

 

similarly as above. It follows that h′(z)/h(z) has no singularities at zP since h(zP) ≠ 0 and thus it is analytic at zP. We find that the residue of
f′(z)/f(z) at zP is −m.

Putting these together, each zero zZ of multiplicity k of f creates a simple pole for
f′(z)/f(z) with the residue being k, and each  pole zP of order m of
f creates a simple pole for f′(z)/f(z) with the residue being −m. (Here, by a simple pole we
mean a pole of order one.) In addition, it can be shown that f′(z)/f(z) has no other poles,
and so no other residues.

By the residue theorem we have that the integral about C is the product of 2πi and the sum of the residues.  Together, the sum of the ks for each zero zZ is the number of zeros counting multiplicities of the zeros, and likewise for the poles, and so we have our result.

Applications and consequences
The argument principle can be used to efficiently locate zeros or poles of meromorphic functions on a computer. Even with rounding errors, the expression  will yield results close to an integer; by determining these integers for different contours C one can obtain information about the location of the zeros and poles. Numerical tests of the Riemann hypothesis use this technique to get an upper bound for the number of zeros of Riemann's  function inside a rectangle intersecting the critical line.

The proof of Rouché's theorem uses the argument principle.

Modern books on feedback control theory quite frequently use the argument principle to serve as the theoretical basis of the Nyquist stability criterion.

A consequence of the more general formulation of the argument principle is that, under the same hypothesis, if g is an analytic function in Ω, then

For example, if f is a polynomial having zeros z1, ..., zp inside a simple contour C, and g(z) = zk, then

is power sum symmetric polynomial of the roots of f.

Another consequence is if we compute the complex integral:

 

for an appropriate choice of g and f we have the Abel–Plana formula:

 

which expresses the relationship between a discrete sum and its integral.

Generalized argument principle
There is an immediate generalization of the argument principle. Suppose that g is analytic in the region . Then
 
where the first summation is again over all zeros a of f counted with their multiplicities, and the second summation is again over the poles b of f counted with their orders.

History
According to the book by Frank Smithies (Cauchy and the Creation of Complex Function Theory, Cambridge University Press, 1997, p. 177), Augustin-Louis Cauchy presented a theorem similar to the above on 27 November 1831, during his self-imposed exile in Turin (then capital of the Kingdom of Piedmont-Sardinia) away from France. However, according to this book, only zeroes were mentioned, not poles. This theorem by Cauchy was only published many years later in 1874 in a hand-written form and so is quite difficult to read. Cauchy published a paper with a discussion on both zeroes and poles in 1855, two years before his death.

See also 

 Logarithmic derivative
 Nyquist stability criterion

References
 
 
 
 Backlund, R.-J. (1914) Sur les zéros de la fonction zeta(s) de Riemann, C. R. Acad. Sci. Paris 158, 1979–1982.

External links
 

Theorems in complex analysis